Ufufunyane is a culture-bound syndrome, also described in the culture as a curse and a demonic possession. It is seen in Zulu- and Xhosa-speaking communities in southern Africa. In Kenya, it is referred to as saka. It is an anxiety state attributed to the effects of magical potions (given to them by rejected lovers), or spirit or demonic possession. It is common in Zulu people.

Signs and symptoms
Signs and symptoms of Ufufunyane include shouting, sobbing, pseudolalia, paralysis, trance-like states, loss of consciousness, temporary blindness and experiencing sexual nightmares.

See also 
 Amafufunyana

References 

Culture-bound syndromes
Mental states
Psychosis
Schizophrenia
Exorcism
Anxiety disorders
Spirit possession